Joshua "Josh" Coan (born February 21, 1998) is an American professional soccer player who currently plays for MLS Next Pro club Sporting Kansas City II.

Playing career

Youth, college and amateur
Coan played with the academy teams at Indiana Fire and North Carolina FC.

Coan began playing college soccer at the University of Pittsburgh in 2016, where he played for two seasons, making 32 appearances and tallying 4 assists. In 2018, Coan transferred to Marquette University for his junior and senior year. At Marquette, Coan made 37 appearances, scoring 9 goals and tallying 7 assists.

While at college, Coan appeared for various USL League Two sides, including spells with North Carolina FC U23, IMG Academy Bradenton, Des Moines Menace and Chicago FC United.

Professional
On January 15, 2020, Coan signed with USL League One side FC Tucson.

Coan moved to USL League One side North Carolina FC on February 9, 2021.

On February 18, 2022, Coan signed with MLS Next Pro club Sporting Kansas City II.

References 

1998 births
American soccer players
Association football forwards
Chicago FC United players
Des Moines Menace players
FC Tucson players
IMG Academy Bradenton players
Living people
Marquette Golden Eagles men's soccer players
MLS Next Pro players
North Carolina FC players
North Carolina FC U23 players
Pittsburgh Panthers men's soccer players
Soccer players from Indiana
Soccer players from North Carolina
Sporting Kansas City II players
USL League One players
USL League Two players